Keisuke Kuwata is the eponymous studio album recorded by Keisuke Kuwata, the frontman of the Japanese rock band Southern All Stars. It was released by Taishita label under the Victor Entertainment in July 1988, shortly after the 10th anniversary of the band. Aside from the 1982 live recording album Kamon Yuzo and Victor Wheels Live released under the pseudonym Yūzō Kamon, it was first Kuwata's solo effort.

Track listing

Personnel
 Keisuke Kuwata – vocals, chorus, produce, arrangement
 Takeshi Kobayashi – keyboards, synthesizer, synth bass, background vocals, produce, arrangement
 Takeshi Fujii – drum programming, synth programming, sequencing, computer programming, produce, arrangement

 Additional players
 Satoshi Kadokura – synthesizer, synth bass, co-arrangement on track 11
 Susumu Osada – guitar
 Sueaki Harada – acoustic guitar, electric guitar, ukulele
 Makoto Saito – acoustic guitar
 Toshiaki Usui – acoustic guitar
 Junichi Kawauchi – acoustic guitar
 Jun Shimoyama – guitar
 Jin Takuma – bass
 Tatsuhiko Hizawa – bass
 Hideo Yamaki – snare, cymbals
 Soul Toul – mallet cymbals
 Osamu Matsumoto – trombone

Guest vocalists
 Ann Lewis – chorus
 Mariya Takeuchi – chorus
 Yūko Hara – chorus
 Masamichi Sugi – chorus
 Haruko Kuwana – chorus
 Yūki Kuwata – shout

Accolades

Japan Record Awards

|-
|  style="width:35px; text-align:center;"| 1988 || Keisuke Kuwata || Excellent Albums  || 
|-

Charts

Weekly charts

Year-end charts

References

1988 albums
Albums produced by Takeshi Kobayashi